Henri Charles Gabriel de Thiard de Bissy, comte de Thiard (7 January 1723 – 26 July 1794) was a French general and writer. He was the younger brother of Claude de Thiard de Bissy, also a general and a writer. Henri was guillotined on the day Robespierre fell during the French Revolution.

External links
 

18th-century French writers
18th-century French male writers
French Army officers
French generals
French people executed by guillotine during the French Revolution
1723 births
1794 deaths
French male writers